Kodaikanal is a city and a Taluk division of Dindigul district in the state of Tamil Nadu, India.

The earliest residents of Kodaikanal were the Paliyan tribal people. The earliest specific references to Kodaikanal and the Palani Hills are found in Tamil Sangam literature of the early Christian era.

Modern Kodaikanal was established as a hill station by American missionaries in 1845, as a refuge from the high temperatures and tropical diseases of the plains.

In the 20th century a few elite Indians came to realize the value of this place and started relocating here. Kodaikanal is sometimes referred to as the "Princess of Hill Stations". Much of the local economy is now based on the hospitality industry, serving national and international tourists.

Etymology
The Tamil language word கோடைக்கானல், refers to "a sanatorium at the top of Kodaikanal, the southern ridge of the Palani hills more than 7,000 ft. high".

It is not known who first used this name or what they intended it to mean, however, in the Tamil language there are at least five meanings. The word is formed from the two separate Tamil words Kodai and kāṉal (கானல்). kāṉal means a wood on a hill-slope, a dense forest or a closed forest.

Another Tamil meaning for வல்லி (Kodi) is Valli, the honey collecting daughter of the chief of the Veddas mountain tribe. In ancient times the chief and his wife prayed to the Mountain God for a girl-child. Their prayers were answered when the chief found a new-born girl child during a hunting expedition. As she was found among creeper plants, they named the child Valli and she grew up as princess of the tribe  Kurinji and became the consort of lord Murugan The romantic traditions of Murugan in Sangam literature are thus claimed to be associated with the name Kodaikanal. By integrating these meanings, Kodaikanal is "that place at the end of Valli's forest which is a gift in the summer".

Recently, tourists and locals have labelled Kodaikanal "Switzerland of the East", "Set of Southern Emeralds", "Chilled paradise among the Hills" and "Summer Heaven".

Ancient times

There is archaeological evidence of human habitation in this area before the Current Era (BCE). Megalithic dolmens dating from early Chera Dynasty times, earthen pots and other artefacts which have been found here prove that the earliest residents of Kodaikanal were the Palaiyar (Pazhaiyar, "old ones") tribal people. Some local relics and artefacts of the Palaiyar can be seen in the Shenbaganur Museum.

The earliest written references to Kodaikanal and the Palani Hills are found in Tamil Sangam literature of the early Christian era. The classical Tamil poetic work Kuṟuntokai, the second book of the anthology Ettuthokai, contains poems dealing with matters of love and separation. It evokes the geographic thinai of the mountainous region of Kurinji. It is the scene of lovers' union at midnight, a forest rich with lakes, waterfalls, teak, bamboo and sandalwood. In this region millet grows and wild bees are a source of honey. 

Love in this setting is exemplified by Murugan, and his consort, Valli, the honey collecting daughter of a Kurinji mountain dweller. He rides a peacock, the bird of the mountains. The name of the region, Kurinji, derives from the name of the famous flower Kurinji found only in the lofty hills of Tamil country.

The once in ten or twelve years blossom of the Kurinji is an event of jubilation and purity symbolizing the frenzy of a sudden love shared, in concert with the unleashed forces of nature: the amorous dance of peacocks, their echoing cries, the splash of waterfalls, the roar of savage beasts. The lovers hold each other tighter still and forget the dangers of the mountain path.

One of the Kuṟuntokai poems:

The legacy of this epic Sangam love poetry is maintained by Arulmighu Dhandayuthapani Swamy Thiru Kovil, Palani at The Kurinji Andavar Temple in Kodaikanal. This holy place is known for the Kurinji flowers which blossom nearby only once every 12 years.

The deity here is called Sri Kurinji Easware. He is in fact Lord Murugan.

Agricultural settlers of the Palani Hills, mainly Mannadiyar ("Kings Relative's) caste, were allotted these hill lands about the 14th century by the Madurai Nayak Dynasty, according to some local people , though others claim that their ancestors came later as refugees from the Palani foothills who escaped from the invasions of Tippu Sultan.

Western settlers
In 1821, the first westerner to visit Kodaikanal, a British Lieutenant, B. S. Ward,  climbed up from his headquarters in the Kunnavan village of Vellagavi to Kodaikanal to survey the area on the hilly ranges of Palani. His report of a healthy climate in beautiful hills with accessibility from Periyakulam encouraged the early settlers.

In 1834, Mr. J.C Wroughten, then Sub-Collector of Madura  and Mr. C. R. Cotton, a member of the Madras Presidency — Board of Revenue, climbed up the hills from Devadanapatti  and built a small bungalow at the head of Adukkam pass near Shenbaganur. 

In 1836, the noted botanist Dr. Robert Wight, a Fellow of the Linnean Society of London, visited Kodaikanal and recorded his observations in the 1837 Madras Journal of Literature and Science. He collected over 100 plant specimens in 15 days, which were useful to later botanists.

In 1845, the first two bungalows, Sunny Side and Shelton were built by six families of American missionaries from Madurai with the help of an Englishman, Mr. Fane. In 1852, Father Louis Saint Cyr visited Kodaikanal and returned to the plains after finding only four bungalows; Baynes, Parker, Clark and Parday.

In 1852, Major J. M. Partridge of the Bombay Army built himself a house in Kodai and became the first person to actually settle there. Others soon followed like Fonclair and the coffee planter, Judge Elliot. It was not until Blackburne, the Collector of Madurai, built a home there that the development of Kodai gathered pace.

In 1853, a group of American and British built Kodai's first church building, the Anglican Church of St. Peter.

In 1853 only seven houses were there and the number rose to a dozen in 1861.

In 1860, The Governor of Madras Presidency, Sir Charles Trevelyan visited Kodaikanal and stayed in Roseneath Cottage, which is still occupied. In May 1860, Father Louis Saint Cyr returned with father Rettary and several Frenchmen, Belgians and Europeans, stayed in Baynes bungalow and by 29 September had bought that place to use as a rest house for the members of Christ Church. The bungalow was renamed La-providence in honor a lady with that name who gave Rs.20,000 for reconstruction of the bungalow.  La Salette Church was finished and dedicated in 1866.

In 1861, Major Douglas Hamilton recorded 114 species of birds in Kodaikanal and discovered two new ones-the laughing thrush and the Kodaikanal white-bellied shortwing.
In 1862, David Coit Scudder arrived in Kodaikanal. He was an American missionary who had been influenced in boyhood to come to India by Rev. Dr. John Scudder, Sr. and was in charge of the large and important station of Periyakulam. He had endeared himself to the Christians of the large village congregations of that station. An enthusiastic young American, upon arrival at Kodai, his emotions overcame him when, as he recalled: I ... seized our United States flag, shouted out "Long may it wave!" ... at the English collector ... and did other uncouth things.

On 19 November 1862, David Scudder drowned in the Vaigai River between Andipatti and Periyakulam, 20 months after arriving in Tamil Nadu.  Interment was in the old Anglican Churchyard, at Kodaikanal. The inscription on his headstone is still clearly legible. It reads:D.C.S. Missionary of the A.B.C.F.M. In Southern India. Born in Boston, U.S.A. Oct. 27, 1835 Landed at Madras June 26, 1861 Drowned in the Vaigai River Nov. 19, 1862

In 1863, acting on a suggestion of Sir Vere Levinge, then collector of Madurai, a lake was formed by blocking a stream. From then on, Kodaikanal has been developing.

In 1867, Major J. M. Partridge of Bombay Army imported Australian eucalyptus and wattle trees to Kodaikanal.

In 1871, the new governor of Madras, Lord Napier visited. His bungalow was named Napier Villa. These early settlements and visits by important people established Kodai's legitimacy among the Western residents of Tamil Nadu as an accepted alternative to Ootacamund as a summer retreat.

In 1872, Lt. Coaker cut a path along the steep south east facing ridge which overlooks the plains below. The 1 km (.6 mi) path was named after him as Coaker's Walk. He is often remembered as "the man who prepared the most exceptional, the most descriptive map of Kodai".

In 1879, 75 Europeans came to Kodai for the season. That year Murray's Handbooks for Travellers described Kodaikanal as a settlement "of only 10 – 15 small ugly houses". Later many American and British families visited and decided to remain in the temperate hill station.

In 1883, Kodaikanal had 615 permanent residents.  It also became a regular summer retreat for many American missionaries and European diplomats who came here primarily to escape the sweltering summer of the plains. Among them,  William Waterbury Scudder D.D. was a missionary who joined the Arcott Mission in 1852, retired in 1894, and was buried at Kodaikanal in 1900.

In 1895, the American Madurai Mission built the Union Church building.

In 1901, the first observations commenced at the Kodaikanal Observatory .

In 1909, when the Guide to Kodaikanal was published by E.M.M.L., there were 151 houses, "most of them anything but small and ugly" and a post office, churches, clubs, schools and shops.

In 1914, the present ghat road was completed and was subsequently improved. In 1989, the total length of the roads on the hills was more than 45 km.

In April 1915, Dr. Van Allen raised funds to construct the first unit of the hospital at the entrance of Coaker's Walk. It was named after him. Facilities got updated from time to time and now it has an X-ray machine, well equipped pathological lab, and an operation theatre with blood transfusion facilities. Government Hospital was a small municipal hospital until 1927. Now it has X-ray, dental, a maternity ward and other facilities.

Dr. Ida S. Scudder had her bungalow at Hilltop,  at Kodaikanal. She had founded  Vellore Christian Medical College and its hospital. She died on 24 May 1960 at age 90, of a circulatory ailment, in Kodaikanal.

Ghat road
Travellers going to Kodaikanal starting their journey at Ammaianayakkanur village travelled  in 12 to 14 hours by bullock cart up to Krishnamma Nayak Thope. From there, the  journey to Kodaikanal was undertaken by foot, horse, or palanquins with hired coolies.

In 1854, an improved  bridle path was built from Krishnamma Nayak Thope. In 1875, the Indian Railways extended its line from Chennai to Tirunelveli and a train station named Kodaikanal Road was built near Ammaianayakkanur village, to facilitate visits to Kodaikanal.

Many started at Dindigul and began their climb to Kodai from Periyakulam. In 1862, Clements Robert Markham described his journey:

Dindigul is about forty miles from the foot of the ghaut leading up to the Pulney hills, and relays of bullocks were posted for me every seven miles, with a man running in front of the cart with a blazing torch.

Passing through the village of Periacolum, round which there are many large tanks and extensive rice cultivation, we reached the jungle at the foot of the Pulney hills at early dawn. The path, which is only practicable for ponies and pack-bullocks, leads up a ravine for half the distance, and then corkscrews up the steep sides of the mountain. The range looks very imposing from the plain...

After resting under a clump of trees I commenced the ascent on foot, driving an unhappy sheep before me, which was to be sacrificed on the summit, where, at this time of the year (end of November and beginning of December), there are no residents, no market, and no means of procuring any supplies. The ascent is exceedingly beautiful, ... 

At 6000 feet the steep ascent is covered with long grass, and trees are confined to sheltered hollows and ravines. After reaching the plateau it is necessary to scale a second steep grassy slope before arriving at the settlement of Kodakarnal, which is 7230 feet above the level of the sea.

Kodakarnal consists of eight houses, built along the crests of undulating hills, and one of the inner slopes is clothed with a wood of fine trees and tree-ferns, from which the Tamil people have named the settlement.

By 1878, the path from Tope was extended and later completed up to Kodaikanal.

Engineer Major G. C. Law was deputed to study and submit a plan to build a moterable road to the hills. The road was finally completed in 1914 and opened for public traffic in 1916. Public buses started using the road in 1916. It is always well maintained.

Also, during World War II, the Kodaikanal–Munnar Road, an evacuation road from Kodai along the hillcrest to Top Station and Munnar, then down to Calicut was built by the British because of fear of the Japanese invading India.

Train
The Kodaikanal-Gudalur Railway line was under the contemplation of the Government from 1889 when the Madras and Travancore Governments made an agreement regarding the waters of the Periyar river In 1895 a survey was made In 1897 after the completion of the Periyar dam, the Government granted permission to the then Wilson and Company, Madras to construct a light railway from Kodaikanal railway station, then Ammaayanaickanur railway station, which lies between Dindigul and Madhurai railway stations, to Gudalur within two years The company failed in floating the capital wanted within the period allotted and thus the permission granted automatically expired. Then the Government made several surveys till 1920 After the close of the First World War, the Government sanction, ed in 1920 this line under the postwar reconstruction scheme and directed the District Board, Madurai to intimate to the Government within two years whether it was willing to take UP this work, as the then South Indian Railway Company and the two planters of the Kannan Devan Hills were willing to undertake the work. In 1922 the district board of Madurai intiiP&ted the Government to cancel the sanction of the Kodaikanal road- Gudalur railway line and requested sanction for the construction of Madurai-Bodinayakanur line Accordingly.

Kodaikanal lake

In 1863, Kodaikanal Lake was created by Sir Vere Hendry Levinge, who was then the Collector of Madurai District, by damming three streams flowing into a valley. He stocked the lake with local fish and brought Kodai's first boat from Tuticorin.  He lived in Pambar House after his retirement. Pictures taken in Kodaikanal during the early years of its settlement show the area around the lake with very few trees and a marshy landscape. The man-made lake then had no bunds.

In 1890, the Kodaikanal Boat Club was formed. Today there are three boat clubs with a variety of boats available for hire. There is now an excellent  lighted and paved sidewalk and bicycle path around the lake.  There are strict municipal laws against construction near the lake.

20th century
In 1901 Kodaikanal had a population of 1,912.
In the 20th century a few elite Indians came to realize the value of this enchanting hill station and started relocating here. Amongst the current Indian locals, there are often discussions about how their ancestors trekked and climbed the hills, from the villages in the foothills. It sometimes took them up to two full days to scale the steep valleys, braving attacks from humans and eventually reaching the summit of what is now Kodaikanal market, to sell their produce from the plains.

Notes

External sources
Crossette, Barbara.
Maloney Clarence, The Beginnings of Civilization in South India, The Journal of Asian Studies, Vol. 29, No. 3 (May 1970), pp. 603–616   (article consists of 14 pages), Published by: Association for Asian Studies.

K
History of Tamil Nadu

Kodaikanal